Euonymus carnosus, called the fleshyflowered spindletree, is a species of flowering plant in the genus Euonymus, native to southeast and southcentral China, Taiwan, the Bonin Islands, the Ryukyu Islands, and Japan. It has gained the Royal Horticultural Society's Award of Garden Merit.

References

carnosus
Plants described in 1886